Percy Daniel (born 19 January 1962) is a Kittitian cricketer. He played in one first-class match for the Leeward Islands in 1991/92.

See also
 List of Leeward Islands first-class cricketers

References

External links
 

1962 births
Living people
Kittitian cricketers
Leeward Islands cricketers